2011 ACC tournament may refer to:

 2011 ACC men's basketball tournament
 2011 ACC women's basketball tournament
 2011 ACC men's soccer tournament
 2011 ACC women's soccer tournament
 2011 Atlantic Coast Conference baseball tournament
 2011 Atlantic Coast Conference softball tournament